Ashbourne may refer to:

Ashbourne, County Meath in Ireland
Ashbourne RFC, a rugby union club
Ashbourne, Derbyshire in England
Ashbourne, South Australia in Australia
Ashbourne, Victoria in Australia
Baron Ashbourne, a title in the peerage of the United Kingdom

See also
Ashbourne Cup
Ashbourne portrait, once thought to prove that Shakespeare was Edward de Vere, 17th Earl of Oxford
 Ashburn (disambiguation)